Ardington Wick is a hamlet in the civil parish of Ardington in the Vale of White Horse, England. It was part of Berkshire until the 1974 local government boundary changes transferred it to Oxfordshire.

Hamlets in Oxfordshire
Vale of White Horse